Durgadas Rathore (13 August 1638 – 22 November 1718) was the Rathore Rajput General of  Kingdom of Marwar. He is credited with having preserved the rule of the Rathore dynasty over Marwar, India, following the death of Maharaja Jaswant Singh in the 17th century. In doing so he had to defy Aurangzeb, a Mughal emperor. He commanded the Rathore forces during the Rajput War (1679–1707) and played a major role in the Rajput Rebellion (1708–1710) which became one of the main reason of decline of Mughal Empire. He was elected as the leader of the revolt along with Raja Jai Singh II of Jaipur. He won a number of victories against the Mughals and forced many Mughal officers to pay tribute to him in the form of chauth.

Early life 
Durgadas was the son of Askaran Rathore, a Rajput minister of Jaswant Singh, the ruler of Marwar. He was a distant relative of the royal family, being a descendant of Karana, a son of Rao Ranmal.

Support for Ajit Singh 

Jaswant Singh was campaigning in Afghanistan when he died in December 1678, leaving no heir. Aurangzeb took the opportunity to intervene by imposing Muslim rule over Marwar.

Soon after Jaswant Singh's death two of his ranis (queens) each gave birth to male children. One of these sons died soon after his birth, leaving the other – Ajit Singh – as sole heir. This news reached Aurangzeb by February 1679 but he chose not to recognise the child as the legitimate heir. He imposed jizya, a tax on non-Muslims, and soon after sold the kingdom to another chieftain, Indra Singh. Aurangzeb had moved his base from Delhi to Ajmer to oversee the subjugation but in April 1679 returned to his capital, leaving administrative and military support in Marwar for the unpopular new ruler.

Prominent grandees of Marwar, including Durgadas& Rajguru Akheraj Singh, went to Delhi to plead the recognition of Ajit Singh as heir. Aurangzeb refused their request, although he did offer to bestow a title and a grant when the child attained the age of majority. Aurangzeb required that the child be raised in the imperial harem and that the ranis live there also. According to one contemporary source, Aurangzeb also offered to give Ajit Singh the throne of Jodhpur in the future if it was agreed that the child was raised in the Muslim faith.

The attitude of Aurangzeb was not acceptable to the Rathore delegation, who resolved upon rescuing Ajit Singh and the ranis from Delhi. They were aware that many of them were likely to die in the process and this proved to be the case: as they retreated from the city on 25 June 1679 they were pursued by Mughal guards and fought several desperate and deadly rearguard actions in order to protect Durgadas, who had the ranis and child with him. The pursuit continued till the evening, when the Mughals finally tired.

The infant Ajit Singh was taken to safety in Balunda, where the wife of one of the delegation kept the child for almost a year. Later, he was moved to the safety of the Aravalli Hills near Abu Sirohi, a remote town on the southern fringes of Marwar. There Ajit Singh grew up in anonymity.

Opposition to the Mughals 

Aurangzeb reacted to these events by deposing the incompetent puppet ruler of Marwar, Indra Singh, and placing it under direct Mughal rule. His forces moved in to occupy the region and "anarchy and slaughter were let loose on the doomed state; all the great towns in the plain were pillaged; the temples were thrown down." He also substituted the son of a milkman for Ajit Singh, raised the child as if he was the rightful heir to Jaswant Singh and denounced the real heir as an imposter.

During the period that followed, when the Mughals controlled Marwar, Durgadas and Akheraj were among those who carried out a relentless struggle against the occupying forces. The capabilities of the Mughal forces were over-extended when Aurangzeb decided to attempt the over-running of Mewar also, and this provided opportunities for Rajputs of various communities, including the Rathores and the Sisodias, to use guerrilla tactics. The Rajput successes were, however, limited in Marwar: the campaign in Mewar was abandoned by the Mughals but Marwar remained in a state of war for nearly three decades.

The cause of the Mughal withdrawal from Mewar had been a rebellion by a son of Aurangzeb, Akbar, who had proved to be incompetent when placed in charge of various forces in Mewar and Marwar. He eventually rebelled against his father and allied himself with the Rajputs. In June 1681 Durgadas assisted Akbar as the rebellion collapsed in disarray, aiding his flight to the court of the recently installed Maratha king Sambhaji. The rebellion diverted resources and Aurangzeb was forced to make peace in Mewar when on the cusp of winning his campaign.

Durgadas was absent from Marwar during the period 1681–1687, during which time he was in the Deccan. He returned to join with the young Ajit Singh, who now came out of hiding, in taking command of Rathore forces opposing Aurangzeb. There was a change from the earlier guerrilla tactics to a more direct opposition but still they were unable to wrest control of Marwar from the Mughals, although they caused much disruption.

Akbar, who was to die in exile in 1704, had left his children in the custody of the Rathores following his failed rebellion. Aurangzeb had become anxious to have them with him and negotiated with Durgadas to this end. He gained custody of his granddaughter in 1694 and of his grandson in 1698. Aurangzeb was particularly grateful to find that Durgadas had arranged for his granddaughter to be schooled in the Muslim faith but he did not restore Marwar to Rathore rule; the agreement was limited to him pardoning and giving the lesser title of jagir to Ajit Singh and appointing Durgadas as a commandant in charge of an imperial force of 3000 men in Gujarat.

Despite the outcome of the negotiations, the relationship between Aurangzeb on the one hand and Ajit Singh and Durgadas on the other remained tense. They viewed each other with mutual suspicion and, in 1702, Aurangzeb ordered the governor of Gujarat to neutralise Durgadas by either arrest or murder. Durgadas became aware of this and fled to Marwar, where he tried to raise a rebel group once more. Despite his reputation and the veneration in which he was held by his countrymen, he was not particularly successful in doing so: they were tired and poorly funded after so many years of war, and the now-adult Ajit Singh had become independent of mind and jealous of the reputation and influence possessed by Durgadas.

Durgadas took advantage of the disturbances following the death of Aurangzeb in 1707 to seize Jodhpur and eventually evict the occupying Mughal force. Ajit Singh was proclaimed Maharaja of Jodhpur and went on to rebuild all the temples that had been desecrated by the occupying Muslims.

Death 
Durgadas after completing his duties successfully and fulfilled the promise which he had given to Jaswant Singh, left Jodhpur and live in Sadri, Udaipur, Rampura, Bhanpura for some time and then left to worship Mahakaal at Ujjain. 

On 22 November 1718, on the banks of the Shipra at Ujjain, Durgadas died at the age of 81 years, his canopy in red stone is still at the Chakratirtha, Ujjain, which is pilgrimage for all freedom fighters and Rajputs.

Recognition 
 Historian Jadunath Sarkar sums up his legacy by commenting:

<Blockquote> A soul of honour, he kept the deserted daughter of Akbar free from every stain and provided her with every facility for Islamic religious training in the wilderness of Marwar. Fighting against terrible odds and a host of enemies on every side, with distrust and wavering among his own country-men, he kept the cause of his chieftain triumphant. Mughal gold could not seduce, Mughal arms could not daunt that constant heart. Almost alone among the Rathors he displayed the rare combination of the dash and reckless valour of a Rajput soldier with the tact, diplomacy and organizing power of a Mughal minister of State. No wonder that the Rathor bard should pray that every Rajput mother should have a son like Durgadas. </Blockquote>

 The government of India released a stamp (in 1988) and various coins (on 25 August 2003) in his honour.

The government of India also introduced commemorative coins in 2003 in the name of Durgadas Rathore.

In popular culture
 Paintings of Durgadas by painter Archibald Herman Müller (1893) at Mehrangarh Museum, Jodhpur and the Government Museum, Bikaner.
 Durgadas is a children's literature novel written by Premchand based on his struggle.
 A play depicting the life of Durgadas was conducted in Jodhpur in October 2017.
Indian films based on his life include the silent feature Veer Durgadas (1924) by Bhagwati Prasad Mishra and the 1960 biographical film Veer Durgadas'' by Ramchandra Thakur, starring Paidi Jairaj in the titular role.

See also 
 List of Rajputs
 Maharana Pratap

References 

1638 births
1718 deaths
History of Rajasthan
People from Jodhpur
Indian military personnel
Indian warriors
Rathores
17th-century Indian people
18th-century Indian people